Oeonistis delia is a moth of the family Erebidae. It was described by Johan Christian Fabricius in 1787. It is found from Sulawesi to New Caledonia, Samoa and Tonga.

References

Moths described in 1787
Lithosiina